Bulcha Demeksa (born 1930) is an outspoken Ethiopian politician and businessman. He is the founder of the Oromo Federalist Democratic Movement (OFDM), one of Ethiopia's largest opposition parties.

Career
In 1967, Bulcha was appointed vice-minister of Finance before representing his country at the board of the World Bank. In 1974, when the Ethiopian Revolution started, he left Ethiopia and was hired by the UN administration. Bulcha took his retirement in Ethiopia in 1991, and in 1994, he created the Awash International Bank which became a success.

In early 2005, Bulcha founded the Oromo Federalist Democratic Movement (OFDM), which he saw as a non-military, democratic political party as an alternative to the armed Oromo Liberation Front.

Bulcha Demeksa has been one of the most outspoken opponents of the late Meles Zenawi's government and the opposition leader most referred by the international media. With other opposition officials, he helped the creation of Medrek, a larger opposition alliance.

Bulcha resigned as OFDM party chairman in late 2010 but continues as an adviser for the leadership. His retirement from OFDM and his harsh criticism of Prime Minister Meles Zenawi and on the 2010 elections were a regular feature story on dozens of private Amharic and English newspapers in the country. In 2019 he announced his intention to run in the 2020 elections.

Awards
At the end of 2008, Bulcha was named "Person of the Year" by Jimma Times, the online version of the defunct Afan Oromo private Yeroo newspaper. He was chosen for his work in the financial sector and his work for human rights and democracy as well as peace activist between different warring sections of the Ethiopian society.

References

1930 births
Living people
Ethiopian evangelicals
Oromo people
Ethiopian businesspeople
Members of the House of Peoples' Representatives
Oromo Federalist Democratic Movement politicians